The 2014–15 season was Aberdeen's 101st season in the top flight of Scottish football and the second in the Scottish Premiership. Aberdeen also competed in the Europa League, League Cup and the Scottish Cup.

Season summary
After securing second spot, manager Derek McInnes was nominated for manager of the year. After banging in almost 30 goals in the season for the club, Adam Rooney was nominated for PFA player of the year. Adam Rooney and Shay Logan were named in PFA Scotland Team of the Year.

Results and fixtures

Friendly matches
Aberdeen played five friendly matches; four took place in pre-season and one in March.

Scottish Premiership

Results

UEFA Europa League

Qualifying phase

Scottish League Cup

Scottish Cup

Squad statistics
During the 2014–15 season, Aberdeen have used twenty nine different players in competitive games. The table below shows the number of appearances and goals scored by each player.

Appearances

|-
|colspan="10"|Players who left the club on loan during the 2014–15 season
|-

|}

Disciplinary record

Goal scorers

Team statistics

League table

Results by round

Results summary

Results by opponent
Aberdeen score first

Source: 2014–15 Scottish Premier League Results Table

Transfers

In

Out

Loans in

Loans out

See also
 List of Aberdeen F.C. seasons

Notes and references

Aberdeen F.C. seasons
Aberdeen F.C.
Aberdeen